Nada Se Compara Contigo (English: Nothing Compares to You) is the tenth studio album recorded by Salvadoran singer-songwriter Álvaro Torres. It was released by EMI Music Latin on November 19, 1991 (see 1991 in music). The album was produced again by Enrique Elizondo. The album received a nomination for Pop Album of the Year at the 5th Annual Lo Nuestro Awards.

Track listing

Personnel 
Credits adapted from Nada Se Compara Contigo liner notes.
Musicians

 Álvaro Torres – lead vocals, composing
 Selena – lead vocals (track 2)
 Chuck Anderson – arrangements
 Daniel Ash – composing
 Kevin Haskins – composing
 David J – composing
 A.B. Quintanilla III – arrangements (track 2)

Production

Enrique Elizondo – Record producer
Bob Biles – engineering
Chris Morrison – engineering assistance
 Brian "Red" Moore – mixer (track 2)

Recording

 Recorded at Santa Fe Recording Studios, Van Nuys, California

Charts

Weekly charts

Year-end charts

References

1991 albums
Álvaro Torres albums
EMI Latin albums
Spanish-language albums